The Diplomatic Privileges Act 1708 (7 Ann c 12) was an Act of the Parliament of Great Britain. It is also known as the Act of Anne or the Statute of Anne. It should not be confused with the Copyright Act 1710, also known as the Statute of Anne.

Background 
The Act was passed as result of an incident in 1708 when the Russian Ambassador, Andrey Matveyev, was arrested and imprisoned by London bailiffs acting on behalf of his creditors. Matveyev was freed on bail, then left the country without presenting his letters of recall. To appease Peter the Great, the Act was passed, putting diplomatic immunity in Britain on a statutory basis for the first time.

Provisions 
The Act provided for the nullity of all civil proceedings against ambassadors and their servants. It also provides that all those who institute such proceedings or attempt to enforce them shall "be deemed violators of the laws of nations" and be punished accordingly.

The Act was said to be declaratory of the common law, although this has been doubted by later authorities.

Repeal
Section 6, to "pleading and" was repealed by section 1 of, and the Schedule to, the Statute Law Revision Act 1887.

The whole Act was repealed by section 8(4) of, and Schedule 2 to, the Diplomatic Privileges Act 1964. It may be still in force in some Commonwealth jurisdictions.

References
The text of the act
Halsbury's Statutes,

Great Britain Acts of Parliament 1708
Diplomatic immunity and protection